The 1987 European Indoor Championships was a women's tennis tournament played on indoor carpet courts at the Saalsporthalle Allmend in Zürich in Switzerland and was part of the Category 3 tier of the 1987 WTA Tour. It was the fourth edition of the tournament and was held from 26 October until 1 November 1987. First-seeded Steffi Graf won her second successive singles title  and earned $30,000 first-prize money and 210 Virginia Slims points.

Finals

Singles
 Steffi Graf defeated  Hana Mandlíková 6–2, 6–2
 It was Graf's 10th singles title of the year and the 18th of her career.

Doubles
 Nathalie Herreman /  Pascale Paradis defeated  Jana Novotná /  Catherine Suire 6–3, 2–6, 6–3
 It was Herreman's 1st doubles title of her career. It was Paradis' 1st title of the year and the 2nd of her career.

References

External links
 ITF tournament edition details
 Tournament draws

European Indoors
Zurich Open
1987 in Swiss tennis